Martignoni is an Italian surname. Notable people with the surname include:

Adolf Martignoni (1909–1989), Swiss ice hockey player
Antoinette Martignoni (born 1918), American artist
Arnold Martignoni (1901–1984), Swiss ice hockey player
Bruno Martignoni (born 1992), Swiss footballer

Italian-language surnames